Jason Kemper Sears (23 January 1968 – 31 January 2006) was an American punk rock vocalist from Santa Barbara, California, best known for his work with Rich Kids on LSD (RKL), from 1982 to their first breakup in 1990 and again from 1993 to 2006. He was also a nationally ranked snowboarder at one time and sponsored by Barfoot snowboarding team.

Sears was one of many singers to contribute to the album Strait Up, made in memory of Lynn Strait, the late lead singer of the band Snot. Sears provided vocals for the track "Until Next Time".

In 2006, Sears died in a detoxification clinic in Tijuana, Mexico, of pulmonary thrombosis unrelated to the treatment. According to Mexican authorities he had been suffering from serious skin abscesses and an infection. He was being treated for addiction with ibogaine, a psychoactive compound with anti-addictive properties that is illegal in the U.S.

Sears is remembered by NOFX in the song "Doornails" from the 2006 album Wolves in Wolves' Clothing, a tribute to punk rock musicians from Southern California who have died. The Sears reference is in the line, "This Patrón's for Jason."

References

External links

1968 births
2006 deaths
American punk rock singers
Drug-related deaths in Mexico
Respiratory disease deaths in Mexico
Deaths from pulmonary thrombosis
20th-century American male singers
20th-century American singers
Rich Kids on LSD members